Hisham A. Fahmy an Association Executive.

Mr. Fahmy is the CEO of the American Chamber of Commerce in Egypt, Inc. (AmCham Egypt, Inc.) located in Washington, DC. He previously served as executive director then CEO of the American Chamber of Commerce in Egypt since December 1999, before which he was general manager from 1987 to 1993.

Mr. Fahmy has been playing an instrumental role in promoting US-Egypt business relationship, through the organization of over 29 business missions to Washington D.C. and other States. Under his leadership, AmCham Egypt’s membership reached over 1,900 members and 90 staff.

For over 20 years, Fahmy has been advocating for a friendly business environment for US companies operating in Egypt and Egyptian companies working with the United States. Fahmy helped in the formation of the AmCham MENA council in seven countries to promote US business and investment in the MENA region.

Mr. Fahmy previously served as acting director of the Egyptian Center for Economic Studies, a nonprofit think tank that carries out and disseminates independent economic research. He worked on implementing programs that furthered the center's mission and oversaw the acquisition of an endowment for the sustainability of the center.

He has extensive private sector experience including the development of quality systems and business development programs for an Egyptian conglomerate, International Group of Investments (IGI). He has experience in the tourism sector and worked in representing engineering, construction and electronics firms. Mr. Fahmy is currently a non-resident fellow at the Middle East Institute. He also serves on the advisory board of AUC's School of Business and the President's advisory board of the American Research Center in Egypt (ARCE). He is a board member of Education for Employment association, America-Mideast Educational and Training Services (AMIDEAST), and a member of the American Society for Association Executives (ASAE). He is also the founder and former chairman of the Egyptian Society of Association Executives (EgSAE), an association whose mission is to enhance the professional management of associations in Egypt.

Hisham Fahmy graduated from the American University in Cairo (AUC) in 1974 with a bachelor's degree in chemistry.

External links
 Hisham Fahmy - Fox News

References

Egyptian chief executives
Living people
Year of birth missing (living people)